Michael Brian Poulin (born June 10, 1945) is an American equestrian. He was born in Newport, Rhode Island. He won a bronze medal in team  dressage at the 1992 Summer Olympics in Barcelona, together with Robert Dover, Carol Lavell and Charlotte Bredahl.

References

External links

1945 births
Living people
Sportspeople from Newport, Rhode Island
American male equestrians
American dressage riders
Olympic bronze medalists for the United States in equestrian
Equestrians at the 1992 Summer Olympics
Medalists at the 1992 Summer Olympics